Runcton is a large hamlet in the Chichester district of West Sussex, England. It lies on the B2166 road 1.9 miles (3 km) southeast of Chichester.

In the 2011 census the population of the hamlet was included in the civil parish of North Mundham.

The village includes local amenities including a farm shop, garden centre, pub, nearby North Mundham primary school and Chichester Free School.

History
Runcton was in the ancient hundred of Boxgrove and listed in the Domesday Book (1086) as having 26 households (six villagers, five slaves and 15 cottagers). Resources included ploughing lands, two mills and a fishery.

Prior to 1086, the Norman lord Roger of Montgomery, Earl of Shrewsbury and Chichester, gave the manor of Runcton to the Norman abbey of Troarn: in 1260, Bruton Priory in Somerset took over all the English lands of Troarn abbey.  After the dissolution of the monasteries, Thomas Bowyer bought the manor of Runcton and joined it with the manor of North Mundham.

Runcton Manor is a Grade II-listed house on Runcton Lane: the main front part is a Regency era building, from the late 18th/early 19th century, with an older building to the rear.

In 1848, the hamlet of Runcton had 98 inhabitants.

References

External links

Villages in West Sussex